Bridlewood is a neighbourhood in Kanata South Ward in the western part of Ottawa, Ontario, Canada. Bridlewood was part of the Township of Nepean until 1978, and then part of the City of Kanata until 2001, when that city amalgamated with the City of Ottawa.

Location 
According to the Bridlewood Community Association, the neighbourhood is located east of Eagleson Road, south and west of the National Capital Commission Greenbelt, and north of Hope Side Road. As of the 2016 Canada Census, this area had a population of 24,400. This community is located in the southeast part of the former city of Kanata and is 12 km from the boundary of pre-amalgamation Ottawa proper.

History 

Bridlewood began to develop as a residential area in the 1980s in the northern part of the community. Previous to that, the land was used for agricultural purposes.

Most of the land that became Bridlewood was originally part of the Deevy farm, in the Township of Nepean. On December 1, 1978, Bridlewood was amalgamated into the new City of Kanata. The farmhouse and barn remained in the centre of the community just off Equestrian Drive until it was demolished in 2013.

In the early 1970s, Ontario Hydro installed a hydro line corridor through what would become the community, and in 1989 the voltage of the hydro lines was increased from a single 230 kV line to two (i.e., twin) towers with 500 kV lines.  The Bridlewood Residents Hydro Line Committee (now defunct) opposed this change, citing concerns for children's health when exposed to electromagnetic radiation.  The BRHLC struggle received national media attention, including by CTV's W5 and CBC's The Journal.

According to the Canada 2006 Census, there were 19,167 people living in Bridlewood. The 2011 Census reported 21,247 people living in Bridlewood. According to the Canada 2016 Census, 24,400 people were reported living in Bridlewood.

Community 
The Bridlewood Community Association (BCA) serves not only Bridlewood but the adjacent community of Emerald Meadows.  The BCA deals with various community matters including sports, outdoor hockey rinks, garage sales, safety and security, business networking, traffic volume concerns, and developer and zoning activity.

Bridlewood is served by local councillor Allan Hubley as it is part of the Kanata South Ward.

Sports 
Sports participation is significant in Bridlewood.  The BCA estimates participance of over 800 children for the 2007 soccer program.  Bridlewood is a community participant in the True Sport movement, which is a Canadian program espousing goals of ensuring positive and meaningful experiences for sport participants.

Schools 
There are six elementary schools in this area:

Primary schools 
W.O. Mitchell Elementary School
Bridlewood Community Elementary School
Roch Carrier Elementary School

Catholic schools 

St. James Catholic School
St. Anne Catholic School
Elizabeth Bruyere Catholic School

New public French language elementary school "École élémentaire publique Kanata-Sud" was opened in September 2010.

Community shopping plazas
There are four strip malls in this community:

Stonehaven Plaza
Located at 701 Eagleson Road.
 Optometrist
 Bridlewood Animal Hospital
 Big Bone BBQ
 Hair Tech (Hair Salon) Formerly known as Hair Tech 2000
 Kanata Music Academy
 Scotiabank
 Polish Nail Bar

Eagleson Plaza
Located at 700 Eagleson Rd.
 Beer Store
 Bridlewood Chiropractic and Massage Therapy (Moved 320 Eagleson Rd)
 Bridlewood Home Hardware
 Domino's Pizza
 First Choice Haircutters
 Goodlife Fitness 
 Harvey's
 Heavenly Spa
 Kanata Dental Centre
 Rogers Plus
 Shoppers Drug Mart
 Starbucks Coffee
 Subway
 TD Canada Trust
 Wild Wing

Bridlewood Square

 Black Belt Excellence Martial Arts
 Bridlewood Medical Centre
 Bridlewood Dental
 Circle K (formerly Mac's Milk)
 Gabriel Pizza and Italian Restaurant
 Population Hair Salon 
 The Works (Gourmet Burger Bistro)
 Hurley's
 Tiny Hoppers
 Snap Fitness

Kanata South

Opening Spring/Summer 2020
Metro

Notable residents 
 Gordon O'Connor - Member of Parliament

References

External links
Bridlewood Community Association, accessed 12 November 2006

Neighbourhoods in Ottawa